Ramiyeh (also Romanized as Ramīyeh) is a village in Seyyedvaliyeddin Rural District, Sardasht District, Dezful County, Khuzestan Province, Iran. At the 2006 census, its population was 16, in 4 families.

References 

Populated places in Dezful County